Inna Anatoliivna Tsymbalyuk (born June 11, 1985) is a Ukrainian actress and model who was crowned Miss Ukraine Universe 2006. She placed in the top 20 at the Miss Universe 2006 pageant.

References

External links 

Inna Tsimbalyuk at vk.com 

Living people
1985 births
Miss Universe 2006 contestants
Actors from Chernivtsi
Ukrainian television actresses
Ukrainian female models
Ukrainian beauty pageant winners